Paroa may refer to:

Paroa, Khyber Pakhtunkhwa, Pakistan
Paroa, Bay of Plenty, a settlement in the Bay of Plenty region of New Zealand
Paroa, West Coast, a settlement on the West Coast of New Zealand